Adventures on the Wheels of Steel is a 3CD compilation album by Grandmaster Flash and the Furious Five and Grandmaster Melle Mel. It was released in 1999 on the Castle Music label and is a boxed set containing three CDs in slimline jewel cases together with a fold out insert.

This set contains a mixture of tracks by the various incarnations of Grandmaster Flash and the Furious Five including their debut Super Rappin' No 1 and Grandmaster Melle Mel. Several errors are present with regards to the correct artist. Two previously unreleased tracks are included (*).

The foldout booklet repeats the essay by Lewis Dene (Blues & Soul Magazine) from October 1997 that originally appeared on the album The Greatest Mixes.

Track listing 
CD1
 "Freedom" (Grandmaster Flash and the Furious Five) – 8:18
 "The Birthday Party" (Grandmaster Flash and the Furious Five) – 8:21
 "The Adventures of Grandmaster Flash on the Wheels of Steel" (Grandmaster Flash) – 7:13
 "Showdown" (The Furious Five meets The Sugarhill Gang) – 5:55
 "It's Nasty (Genius of Love)" (Grandmaster Flash and the Furious Five) – 7:53
 "Flash to the Beat (Parts 1 & 2)" (Grandmaster Flash) – 10:49
 "The Message" (Grandmaster Flash and the Furious Five featuring Melle Mel and Duke Bootee) – 7:13
 "Scorpio" (Grandmaster Flash and the Furious Five) – 4:54
 "Message II (Survival)" (Melle Mel and Duke Bootee) – 6:54
 "New York New York" (Grandmaster Flash and the Furious Five) – 7:26

CD2
 "White Lines (Don't Do It)" (Grandmaster Flash and Melle Mel) – 7:39
 "Jesse" (Grandmaster Melle Mel) – 6:13
 "Beat Street" (Grandmaster Melle Mel & the Furious Five with Mr. Ness & Cowboy) – 7:07
 "We Don't Work for Free" (Grandmaster Melle Mel and the Furious Five) – 5:03
 "Step Off" (Furious Five featuring Melle Mel & Scorpio)  – 7:22
 "Pump Me Up" (Grandmaster Melle Mel and the Furious Five) – 4:40
 "Mega-Melle Mix" (Grandmaster Melle Mel) – 5:00
 "King of the Streets" (Grandmaster Melle Mel) – 5:11
 "Vice" (Grandmaster Melle Mel) – 5:05
 "Street Walker" (Mass Production with special guest Grandmaster Melle Mel) – 6:14
 "Super Rappin' No 1" (Grandmaster Flash and the Furious Five) – 12.03

CD3
 "Trinidad Spot" (Grandmaster Melle Mel) – 0:39
 "She's Fresh" (Grandmaster Flash and the Furious Five) – 4:56
 "It's A Shame (Mt. Airy Groove)" (Grandmaster Flash and the Furious Five) – 4:58
 "Internationally Known" (Grandmaster Melle Mel and the Furious Five) – 6:50
 "Hustlers Convention" (Grandmaster Melle Mel and the Furious Five) – 6:15
 "The Truth" (Grandmaster Melle Mel and the Furious Five) – 4:18
 "World War III" (Grandmaster Melle Mel and the Furious Five) – 8:48
 "The New Adventures of Grandmaster" (Grandmaster Melle Mel and the Furious Five) – 5:40
 "Freestyle" (Grandmaster Melle Mel and the Furious Five) – 4:46
 "Black Man" (Grandmaster Melle Mel and the Furious Five) – 4:00
 "Drug Wars" (Grandmaster Melle Mel and the Furious Five) – 4:46
 "Kick the Knowledge" (Grandmaster Melle Mel and the Furious Five) – 4:18 *
 "D.C. Cab" (Grandmaster Melle Mel and the Furious Five) – 4:22 *

Notes 
 "The Adventures of Grandmaster Flash on the Wheels of Steel" is incorrectly credited. It should be credited to 'Grandmaster Flash and the Furious Five'. 
 "White Lines (Don't Do It)" has also been credited to 'Grandmaster Flash and the Furious Five' and as 'Grandmaster and Melle Mel'. 
 "Beat Street" was also released in an edited version as Beat Street Breakdown. 
 "Step Off" is incorrectly credited. It should be credited to 'Grandmaster Melle Mel and the Furious Five'. 
 "Mega-Melle Mix" has also been released as Step Off Megamix. 
 "Trinidad Spot" is a radio advert for then upcoming shows in Trinidad on July 8 and 9.
 "Internationally Known" is incorrectly credited. It should be credited to Grandmaster Melle Mel and the Furious Five. It originally appeared on Greatest Messages.
 "Hustlers Convention" has the word 'shit' bleeped out.
 "The Truth" is the slightly edited version. It is also incorrectly credited. It should be credited to 'Grandmaster Melle Mel and the Furious Five'. 
 "D.C. Cab" was re-written and released as "Jesse".

References 

Grandmaster Flash and the Furious Five albums
1999 compilation albums